Mihaela Peneș (born 22 July 1947) is a retired javelin thrower from Romania. She competed at the 1964 and 1968 Olympics and won a gold and a silver medal, respectively.

Peneș first trained in swimming, handball and basketball, and changed to athletics because of her mother, a former athlete. In 1963, she won the national junior championships, setting a national record in the javelin throw, and since 1964 competed as a senior. After finishing her active career she worked as an athletics coach and official. In 1990, she joined the Romanian Olympic Committee, in 1995 became head of its international department, and in January–April 1999 served as its Secretary General.

References

1947 births
Romanian female javelin throwers
Athletes (track and field) at the 1964 Summer Olympics
Athletes (track and field) at the 1968 Summer Olympics
Olympic gold medalists for Romania
Olympic silver medalists for Romania
Sportspeople from Bucharest
Olympic athletes of Romania
Living people
Medalists at the 1968 Summer Olympics
Medalists at the 1964 Summer Olympics
Olympic gold medalists in athletics (track and field)
Olympic silver medalists in athletics (track and field)
Universiade medalists in athletics (track and field)
European Athletics Championships medalists
Universiade gold medalists for Romania